Bruno Astorre (11 March 1963 – 3 March 2023) was an Italian accountant and politician. A member of the Democratic Party, he served in the Senate of the Republic from 2013 to 2023.

Astorre committed suicide in Rome on 3 March 2023 at the age of 59.

References

1963 births
2023 deaths
2023 suicides
Democracy is Freedom – The Daisy politicians
Democratic Party (Italy) politicians
Senators of Legislature XVII of Italy
Senators of Legislature XVIII of Italy
Senators of Legislature XIX of Italy
Libera Università Internazionale degli Studi Sociali Guido Carli alumni
Politicians from Rome
Italian politicians who committed suicide